The 2011 Women's Quadrangular Series were two Quadrangular Series that took place in Sri Lanka in April 2011. The four teams competing were Ireland, the Netherlands, Pakistan and Sri Lanka. The teams first played in a T20I series, consisting of semi-finals and a final, which was won by Pakistan. They then played in a ODI round-robin series, which was again won by Pakistan. Sri Lanka and Pakistan also faced each other in a one-off ODI before the series started.

Squads

Only ODI: Sri Lanka v Pakistan

T20 Quadrangular Series

Semi-finals

Third-Place play-off

Final

ODI Quadrangular Series

Points table
Note: P = Played, W = Wins, L = Losses, NR = No Results, Pts = Points, NRR = Net run rate.

 Source: ESPNCricinfo

Fixtures

References

External links
Women's Quadrangular Series (in Sri Lanka) 2011 from Cricinfo
Women's t20 Quadrangular Series (in Sri Lanka) 2011 from Cricinfo

Pakistan women's national cricket team tours
Ireland women's cricket team tours
Women's international cricket tours of Sri Lanka
International cricket competitions in 2011
2011 in women's cricket
Women's Twenty20 cricket international competitions